Domagoj Abramović (born 1 April 1981) is a Croatian footballer who plays for NK Omladinac Strmec. He was part of the Croatian squad at the 2004 UEFA European Under-21 Football Championship.

Career

Club career 
Abramović joined NK Dinamo Zagreb as an eight-year-old and scored over 100 goals in various age levels. In 1998, when he was only 17 years old, he debuted in the Dinamo's first team. He came in as a  substitute for Mihael Mikić in UEFA Champions League match against Olympiakos.

He had to wait his premier league debut for a season over, until he got his chance in 2000 against NK Cibalia and scored two goals. He did not break into the first team and was loaned to Croatia Sesvete in the second league. After a successful season in Sesvete he was back in Dinamo.

Next season he got 9 matches in the league, all as a substitute. After the season, he moved to Cibalia Vinkovci, hoping to get more playing time. In the next two season with Cibalia, he played in 30 matches and managed to score only 4 goals.

After years in Croatian football he changed country and signed for NK Široki Brijeg in Bosnia and Herzegovina. There he became a leading scorer for the club and lead the club to championship in 2004. He played 4 seasons in Brijeg and scored 34 goals in 81 league matches. In 2007, he moved back to Croatia and Lokomotiva Zagreb. He played 16 matches in the Dinamo's reserve team in third league, until in July 2008, he moved to Finnish Veikkausliiga club FC Inter Turku. He had visited the club already in January, but did not get a contract offer. Abramović won the Finnish championship with FC Inter and was an important part of the winning team.

Abramović left Inter Turku in January 2012, and in March same year he came back to Croatia, signing for HNK Gorica. After helping Gorica to avoid relegation with his 12 goals, Abramović joined their second division rivals NK Lučko. He later played for NK Nur Zagreb.

International career 
Abramović was part of the Croatian youth teams from under-16 to 21, but lost his place after 2004 UEFA European Under-21 Football Championship due to lack of playing time in club level. He also played in 1998 European Under-16 Football Championship and in 2000 European Under-18 Football Championship.

Honours

Club
 NK Dinamo Zagreb
 Croatian Cup: 2001
 NK Široki Brijeg
 Premier League of Bosnia and Herzegovina: 2004, 2006
 FC Inter Turku
 Veikkausliiga: 2008

References

External links
Domagoj Abramović at sportmanager.hr

1981 births
Living people
Footballers from Zagreb
Association football forwards
Croatian footballers
Croatia youth international footballers
Croatia under-21 international footballers
GNK Dinamo Zagreb players
NK Croatia Sesvete players
HNK Cibalia players
NK Široki Brijeg players
NK Lokomotiva Zagreb players
FC Inter Turku players
Thrasyvoulos F.C. players
Olympiacos Volos F.C. players
Pierikos F.C. players
HNK Gorica players
NK Lučko players
NK Sesvete players
NK Vinogradar players
NK Dubrava players
Croatian Football League players
Premier League of Bosnia and Herzegovina players
Veikkausliiga players
Super League Greece players
Football League (Greece) players
First Football League (Croatia) players
Croatian expatriate footballers
Expatriate footballers in Bosnia and Herzegovina
Croatian expatriate sportspeople in Bosnia and Herzegovina
Expatriate footballers in Finland
Croatian expatriate sportspeople in Finland
Expatriate footballers in Greece
Croatian expatriate sportspeople in Greece